Derek K C Leung (born 30 Jul 1988) is a horse racing jockey. He won the Asian Young Guns Challenge 2010 in Kranji, Singapore. He rode as an apprentice jockey until claiming his 70th win on board Star Of Fame on 1 June 2011.  He is licensed as a jockey in Hong Kong for the 2014-2015 season

Major Wins 
Premier Bowl - Inspiration (2009), Wishful Thinker (2020)
Hong Kong Mile - Beauty Generation (2017)
Hong Kong Classic Cup - Mission Tycoon (2019)
Jockey Club Cup - Reliable Team (2021)

Performance

References

Hong Kong jockeys
1988 births
Living people